Drinks After Work is the seventeenth studio album by American country music artist Toby Keith. It was released on October 29, 2013 by Show Dog-Universal Music. Keith wrote or co-wrote nine of the album's new tracks. A deluxe edition was also released with three bonus tracks.

Commercial performance
In its first week of release, the album debuted at number 7 on the Billboard 200, selling 35,000 copies. As of September 2015, the album has sold 140,000 copies in the U.S.

Track listing

Personnel
Adapted from liner notes.

Greg Barnhill - background vocals (tracks 1, 4-12)
Pat Bergeson - harmonica (tracks 1, 6, 8)
Perry Coleman - background vocals (track 3)
J.T. Corenflos - electric guitar (tracks 2, 7)
Chad Cromwell - drums
Eric Darken - percussion, vibraphone (track 2)
Kevin "Swine" Grantt - bass guitar (track 4)
Kenny Greenberg - electric guitar
Rob Hajacos - fiddle (tracks 7, 9, 11, 12)
Aubrey Haynie - fiddle (tracks 6, 8)
Natalie Hemby - background vocals (track 2)
Rob Ickes - dobro (tracks 6, 8)
Alex Jarvis - programming (track 2)
Charlie Judge - cello, Hammond B-3 organ, jews harp, marimba, piano, synthesizer, Wurlitzer
Toby Keith - lead vocals, background vocals (track 2)
Mills Logan - programming (track 1)
Brent Mason - electric guitar (tracks 3, 4, 10-12)
Steve Nathan - Hammond B-3 organ (track 4)
Russ Pahl - electric guitar (track 4), steel guitar (tracks 1-3, 5, 9, 11, 12)
Danny Rader - acoustic guitar (tracks 2, 5, 6), mandolin (tracks 2, 6)
Michael Rhodes - bass guitar (tracks 1, 3, 5, 6, 8, 10)
David Santos - bass guitar (tracks 7, 9, 11, 12)
Natalie Scott - background vocals (track 2)
Jimmie Lee Sloas - bass guitar (track 2)
Bobby Terry - acoustic guitar (tracks 7, 9, 11, 12)
Ilya Toshinsky - banjo (track 1), acoustic guitar (tracks 1, 3, 6, 8, 10), mandolin (track 3)

Chart performance

Weekly charts

Year-end charts

References

2013 albums
Toby Keith albums
Show Dog-Universal Music albums
Albums produced by Toby Keith